Marcus Crandell (born June 1, 1974) is a former professional Canadian football quarterback and coach. He was most recently the offensive coordinator of the Saskatchewan Huskies of the University of Saskatchewan. He played 11 seasons for the Edmonton Eskimos, Calgary Stampeders and Saskatchewan Roughriders from 1997 to 2008 while also spending time in NFL Europe and the XFL. Crandell was named the Grey Cup Most Valuable Player after the Stampeders won the 89th Grey Cup in 2001. He also won a Grey Cup championship with the Roughriders in 2007 as the team's backup quarterback.

Early life
Crandell played high school football at Roanoke High School, located in Robersonville, NC. He went on to play college football at East Carolina University, where he established more than 30 passing and offensive records. He was a candidate for the Johnny Unitas Golden Arm Award in 1996. He led the Pirates to two post-season bowl appearances, including a 19-13 victory over Stanford in the 1995 Liberty Bowl.

1994: 230/401 for 2,687 yards with 21 TD vs. 15 INT.  Also ran for 96 yards with 1 TD.
1995: 235/447 for 2,751 yards with 18 TD vs. 12 INT.  Also ran for 201 yards with 6 TD.
1996: 136/245 for 1,507 yards with 16 TD vs. 10 INT.  Also ran for 109 yards.

Professional career
His professional career has included CFL stops at Saskatchewan as well as Edmonton and Calgary, a stint in NFL Europe with the Scottish Claymores, and a season with the XFL's Memphis Maniax.

Crandell entered the CFL by signing with the Eskimos on May 6, 1997. He dressed for 35 games before being granted free agency on Feb. 16, 2000. Crandell then quarterbacked the Memphis Maniax of the now-defunct XFL and the Scottish Claymores of NFL Europe in 2000.  But after failing to stick with the Kansas City Chiefs and Green Bay Packers, he signed a free agent pact with the Stampeders on May 31, 2001. He won a Grey Cup with the Stampeders in 2001 and spent a total of four seasons with Calgary. He signed as a free agent with the Roughriders in March 2005 and also spent four seasons with the team, primarily as a backup, winning a Grey Cup championship in 2007.

Coaching career
Crandell was hired by the Roughriders as an offensive assistant on July 7, 2009.

In 2011, he became the Offensive Coordinator of the Edmonton Eskimos. He was demoted to quarterbacks coach midway through the 2012 season and did not return to the Eskimos coaching staff in 2013.

For the 2014 season, Crandell joined the expansion Ottawa Redblacks as their quarterbacks coach. He became the offensive coordinator of the University of Saskatchewan Huskies in 2017.

References

1974 births
Living people
African-American players of Canadian football
American football quarterbacks
American players of Canadian football
Calgary Stampeders players
Canadian football quarterbacks
East Carolina Pirates football players
Edmonton Elks coaches
Edmonton Elks players
Memphis Maniax players
Sportspeople from Charlotte, North Carolina
Saskatchewan Roughriders coaches
Saskatchewan Roughriders players
Scottish Claymores players
Ottawa Redblacks coaches
Players of American football from Charlotte, North Carolina
Saskatchewan Huskies football coaches
21st-century African-American sportspeople
20th-century African-American sportspeople